The Amamoor State Forest and Forest Reserve is a riverine rainforest in the Gympie Region in Queensland, Australia. The forest is composed of subtropical vegetation dominated by stands of Melia azedarach (white cedar),  Toona ciliata (red cedar), Araucaria cunninghamii (hoop pine) and A. bidwillii (Bunya pine). The Amamoor creek within the reserve is noted as a habitat for the platypus and several species of endangered frogs. The park station is located on Amamoor Creek Road about 180 kilometers north of the state capital of Brisbane and 20 kilometres southwest of the town of Gympie. This area has a subtropical climate. The elevation of the terrain is 226 meters.

Visitor Facilities
The QPWS operates two camping areas in the forest reserve, both of which are situated on Amamoor Creek.

Amamoor Creek Camping Area is the larger and more spacious of the two and is the location of the annual Gympie Music Muster. 

Cedar Grove Camping Area is quite smaller, yet it still provides a large open area for large groups of campers. 

The Amama Day-Use Area provides picnickers with a pleasant well facilitated area to enjoy the 
diverse features of the forest and Amamoor Creek. Camping is not permitted at Amama.

Walking Track

Walks from Amama Day-Use Area

Amama Walk (Class 4)

Distance: 1.5km

Time: Allow 40 minutes

Walks from Cedar Grove Camping Area

Rainforest Walk (Class 3)

Distance: 1km

Time: Allow 30 minutes

Cedar Grove Hiking Trail (Class 4)

Distance: 4.6km

Time: Allow 2-3 hours

Walks from Amamoor Creek Camping Area

Amamoor Creek Hiking Trail (Class 4)

Distance: 2.5km

Time: Allow 1 hour

See also

 Protected areas of Queensland

References

External links
Map of the Amamoor State Forest

Rainforests
Protected areas of Queensland
Forests of Queensland
Forest reserves